Almshouses were established as charitable housing for the elderly in Maryland. Conditions were generally quite poor due to a lack of care and funding. Almshouses fell into disuse and were discontinued in Maryland in the 20th century.

Almshouse Farms in the Delmarva Peninsula 
Somerset County, Worcester County and Machipongo are three areas Almshouses used to be located in. Almshouses were a place for “poverty ridden elderly who lacked relatives or friends” . It was a place of last resort for many. They are referred to as "poor houses". There was a major lack of care and was run by counties with little funding, historic homes were purchased and then turned into AlmsHouses . They were given a yearly sum of $4,000 . This money was the only funding given and had to help keep the inmates alive for the year. Many Almshouses were in old mansions or large houses ". Dr. C William Chancellor explored the Almshouses and reported “whoever enters here leaves hope behind” .

Structure of Almshouses

Conditions 
Almshouses did not have the best conditions according to Levin A. Seabrease who was interviewed by Orlando Wooten at the Daily Times . There were multiple occasions when an old inmate who was staying there at the time would die and the rest of the inmates would have to bury the deceased man . According to Mr. Seabrease there were about 18 to 22 with half being black and half being white, describing them as “backwards” or “retarded” . During their stay the Almshouses inmates were described horribly. Many people residing in the Almshouses were even found to have cancer that went untreated .  In the 1850/60 census that were found in the Almshouses described inmates as “insane, poor, lame, deaf, dumb, idiotic, blind".

Later History 
Almshouses were eventually closed. In the early 20th century the Almshouses were vacant for the first time since 1871 . Once vacant they await being sold at the public auction . The homes would soon return to being places for happy families to reside.  Many “inmates” who were left were sent to the Eastern Shore Hospital Center located in Cambridge. Here there were better conditions and treatment for the patients.

References 

Wikipedia Student Program
Almshouses in the United States